Sébastien Grignard (born 12 March 1999) is a Belgian professional racing cyclist, who currently rides for UCI WorldTeam . He was promoted from the team's under-23 development squad in 2021.

Major results
2016
 2nd Chrono des Nations
 5th Time trial, National Junior Road Championships
2017
 National Junior Road Championships
1st  Road race
1st  Time trial
 1st Chrono des Nations Juniors
 2nd 
 3rd  Time trial, UEC European Junior Road Championships
 4th Paris–Roubaix Juniors
 4th Nokere Koerse voor Juniores
 5th 
2019
 3rd Road race, National Under–23 Road Championships

References

External links
 

1999 births
Living people
Belgian male cyclists
Cyclists from Hainaut (province)
Sportspeople from Mons
21st-century Belgian people